L'Étienne , is a French comedy drama film from 1933, directed by Jean Tarride, written by Jean Bertin, starring Jacques Baumer.

Cast 
 Jacques Baumer: Fernand Lebarmecide
 Marthe Régnier: Simone Lebarmecide
 Véra Markels: Vassia Poustiano
 Jean Forest: Etienne
 Maximilienne: Aunt Valérie
 Sinoël: Uncle Emile
 Junie Astor: Henriette
 Paul Pauley: César Poustiano
 Robert Moor: the director
 Sophie Duval: Juliette
 Jean Marais (uncredited)

References

External links 
 
 L'Étienne (1933) at the Films de France

1933 films
French comedy-drama films
1930s French-language films
French black-and-white films
French films based on plays
Films based on works by Jacques Deval
1933 comedy-drama films
1930s French films